Mahmud Gami (1765–1855) was a nineteenth-century Kashmiri poet from Doru Shahabad, Anantnag Kashmir. Through his poetic compositions he is well known to introduce Persian forms of Masnavi and ghazal, to the Kashmiri language. One website calls him the founding figure of Urdu ghazal in Kashmir.

Legacy

In August 2022, the Jammu and Kashmir Academy of Art, Culture and Languages, and the union territory's department of tourism, together with the district administration of Anantnag and Mahmud Gami Working Committee, organised a cultural program in Gami's memory at Mahmud Gami park, in Dooru.

References

1765 births
1855 deaths
Kashmiri people
Kashmiri poets
People from Anantnag district
18th-century Indian poets
19th-century Indian poets
Indian male poets
Poets from Jammu and Kashmir
19th-century Indian male writers
18th-century male writers